= Wadiz =

South Korean crowdfunding platform

- Industry: Crowdfunding
- Founded: May 1, 2012; 12 years ago
- Headquarters: Seongnam, South Korea
- Website: www.wadiz.kr/web/main

Wadiz (founded in 2012) is a crowdfunding platform based in South Korea. It allows startups and small and medium-sized companies to look for early-stage fundraising and introduces investors and consumers to products and brands. The platform has various categories, including technology, beauty, fashion, music, character goods, pets, food, books, children's products, games, comics, and travel. Site users can contribute financially to the projects within these categories.

Starting with crowdfunding, Wadiz has expanded its business into pre-orders and Wadiz commerce Store. As of 2026, Wadiz has facilitated approximately 90,000 projects and surpassed 1.5 trillion KRW in cumulative transactions.

Also, in May 2025, Wadiz launched its global crowdfunding service, allowing projects to be opened simultaneously to domestic and overseas supporters.

Recently, Wadiz was named to the Financial Times's (FT) "Asia-Pacific High-Growth Companies 2026" list. This marks the company's fifth appearance on the ranking, following previous selections from 2020 to 2022 and again in 2025.

Wadiz also supports the overseas expansion of companies that have succeeded in crowdfunding. By establishing MOUs with platforms like Makuake in Japan and Zeczec in Taiwan, Wadiz assists domestically crowdfunded products in entering overseas crowdfunding markets.

In 2025, Wadiz also introduced its own private brand, "Wadiz Edition", for the first time through the Wadiz Store, achieving 10 billion KRW in sales within just three days of its launch. Developed in collaboration with makes, the "Wadiz Edition" line is characterized by planning and improving products based directly on feedback from supporters.

The first product of the "Wadiz Edition" was the "Hot Spring Water Shower Filter," developed with Seolleb, a skincare brand specializing in hot spring water cosmetics. By incorporating major requests and feedback from supporters during the initial funding phase, the product featured an improved filter capacity, leading to a complete sell-out within three days of its official release.

As of May 2026, the line expands across various categories, including beauty, food, and living.

Among these, the beauty product "Melanin Wrapping Balm" achieved over 10,000% of its initial funding target. It has also gained significant traction in global markets, including the United States and Japan, joining the mainstream movement of K-beauty's global expansion. Addtionally, in May 2026, the brand launched an EGF Ampoule within its beauty line, successfully closing its funding campaign at over 8,400% of the target goal.

In 2026, Wadiz introduced its Official Global Agency Program to support international makers entering the South Korean market. The program connects them with Korean agencies that provide certification, customs clearance, content production, advertising, customer support, and delivery services for crowdfunding projects in South Korea.

In October 2026, Wadiz launched Maker Intelligence, an AI-based project management system. It analyzes project data and comparable successful campaigns to estimate final funding totals and recommend operational tasks. The system also allows project creators to track changes in performance after implementing the recommendations.

== See also ==
- Comparison of crowdfunding services
